My Own Prison is the debut studio album by American rock band Creed, released in 1997. The album was issued independently by the band's record label, Blue Collar Records, on June 24, 1997, and re-released by Wind-up Records on August 26, 1997. Manager Jeff Hanson matched Creed up with John Kurzweg, and My Own Prison was recorded for $6,000, funded by Hanson. The band wrote several songs, trying to discover their own identity, and in their early days, the members had jobs, while bassist Brian Marshall got a degree. Creed eventually got a record deal with Wind-up and began recording music. After its release, the album was distributed to Florida radio stations.

At the time of My Own Prison publication, Creed were compared to several bands, including Soundgarden (especially the Badmotorfinger era), Pearl Jam, Alice in Chains, Hootie & the Blowfish, Metallica, and Tool. Influenced by heavy metal and 1970s stadium rock, My Own Prison music has been described as grunge,  and "slightly heavy metal, slightly alternative". The album is a lot more heavy and grunge-oriented than Creed's subsequent work. Its lyrics include topics like emerging adulthood,  Christianity and faith, sinning, suicide, unity, struggling to prosper in life,  and  Vocalist Scott Stapp and guitarist Mark Tremonti said their early adulthood inspired lyrics to songs like the title track and "Torn". Stapp was inspired by music by U2 (particularly The Joshua Tree), Led Zeppelin, and the Doors. Influenced by thrash metal bands like Metallica, Slayer, Exodus, and Forbidden, Tremonti brought heavy metal musical elements into Creed's music.

Creed released four singles from the album: the title track, "Torn", "What's This Life For", and "One". Despite only peaking at number 22 on the Billboard 200, strong radio airplay propelled My Own Prison to become a commercial success. All singles (except "One") had music videos that received airplay on MTV while also finding success on the Modern Rock Tracks and Mainstream Rock Tracks charts. My Own Prison was eventually certified sextuple platinum by the Recording Industry Association of America and, as of 2009, sold over 6,000,000 copies in the United States, according to Nielsen SoundScan. The album received reviews ranging from positive to negative, complimenting its guitar riffs and music but criticizing its similarity to 1990s grunge bands.

Background, writing, recording, and production
For the band's debut release, manager Jeff Hanson matched them up with John Kurzweg, a producer friend who, with his unobtrusive production style and talents as a songwriter and multi-instrumentalist, he felt was a great fit. The album, funded by Hanson, was recorded for $6,000. My Own Prison was originally released independently on the band's own label, Blue Collar Records, in 1997. It was distributed to Florida radio stations, and their enthusiasm for the record helped it sell 6,000 copies in the first two months in Florida alone. Vocalist Scott Stapp said that even though the band was trying to find their creative stride, it took a while for them to discover their musical style. He said: "I remember after Mark and I and the guys wrote our first five or seven songs and we hadn't found our identity yet. Then we wrote a song called 'Grip My Soul', which we never recorded or put out but I remember leaving band rehearsal and all of us felt the same way. Like, alright, we found ourselves. We found out who we are and then right after that is when 'My Own Prison' poured out of us". He added: "If I'm remembering correctly, those were essentially the next 10 out of 13 songs that we wrote after that initial 'find your identity' moment that I think every band has". Guitarist Mark Tremonti said that in the band's early days, he was working as a cook at Chili's and Stapp was a cook at Ruby Tuesday's. Drummer Scott Phillips was managing a knife store at a mall and bassist Brian Marshall was the only one without a job, and, according to Tremonti, Marshall "was also the only one who ended up getting his degree before it was all said and done". When Creed got a record deal, the band got an advance, and Tremonti quit his job and started working for about three weeks at the local guitar shop and then after that, Creed began touring. My Own Prison was originally released through Blue Collar Records but was remixed by Wind-up Records and then re-issued. Creed recorded the original version of the album in Kurzweg's house in Tallahassee, Florida. To record the rest of the album, they went to Long View Farm in Massachusetts.

Music and lyrics

My Own Prison is a lot heavier and more grunge-oriented than other Creed albums. Its lyrical themes include  Christianity, faith, sinning,  and  The music has been described as grunge,  alternative metal, and heavy metal. Jon Parales of The New York Times compared the album to the Badmotorfinger era of Soundgarden. He also likened the music to Hootie & the Blowfish and the song "Unforgiven" to Metallica. Stephen Thomas Erlewine of AllMusic wrote that "Creed don't have an original or distinctive sound—they basically fall into the category of post-Seattle bands who temper their grunge with a dose of Live earnestness". In 1997, when My Own Prison first brought the band attention from the mainstream, Bradley Bambarger of Billboard wrote that Creed sound "disconcertingly reminiscent of Alice in Chains". Justin Seremet of the Hartford Courant wrote that Creed "is essentially Alice in Chains without the bite", comparing singer Stapp's vocals to that of the deceased AIC vocalist, Layne Staley. He described the album as "scrunge", which he defined as "the adopted name for groups that rode the Seattle wave with a couple of hits and subsequently vanished—bands like Silverchair, Sponge, Candlebox, and so on." In a review of My Own Prison, The Spokesman-Review described Creed as "slightly heavy metal, slightly alternative". The New Rolling Stone Album Guide described the record as being influenced by 1970s stadium rock and wrote that it includes "thundering metallic tracks and sweeping ballads". Phil Freeman of Stereogum wrote:

Stapp was heavily influenced by U2's album The Joshua Tree as well as by the Doors and Led Zeppelin. The band was frequently compared to Tool, Soundgarden, and Pearl Jam, in response to which, Stapp said: "It could be worse. They could be comparing us to some shitty band that no one has ever heard of, rather than the biggest band of the decade." Likewise, Tremonti stated, "It doesn't bother me so much. They're one of the best bands to come out in the past 10 years."

The track "What's This Life For" is about a best friend of Tremonti's who committed suicide, and the guitarist has described it as "a song about suicide and kids searching for that meaning of life". "One", a more catchy and upbeat-sounding track, criticizes society's alleged lack of unity. "Torn", written by Tremonti, is autobiographical. Prior to Creed's success, the guitarist held various jobs to pay for college, including washing cars and working as a cook. "One day, I came home from work at about 3 in the morning," he said. "I was all dirty and stinky and hating my life, so I just wrote a song about what it's like being a kid in between 18 and 23, when you haven't graduated from school yet and you don't know what you're doing with your life." He added: "It's about how hard that period of time is, when you're broke, you have to work two jobs to go to school. I was at a hard point in my life, so I wrote a song about it".

Artwork and packaging
Prior to releasing the album on their own independent label, Creed recruited Daniel Tremonti, Mark's brother, to become their creative director. Stapp described Daniel as a "super soulful guy with the heart and talent of a true artist". They picked a photo that Daniel had taken for a photography class as the cover for the record. The image was of a man named Justin Brown, a friend of the band, depicting him kneeling shirtless in a corner with his hands on top of his head. Stapp claimed the artwork "captured him to the core" and that it reflected the isolation, conflict, and torture that was driving him as well as seeing hope and feeling that he was like the man in the artwork, "who had been beaten down but could now get up". Looking to have a professional-looking final product, the band acquired a loan from bassist Brian Marshall's father and went to a one-stop company to package and manufacture the record. They ordered five thousand copies and took them to major outlets in Tallahassee. All five thousand were sold within the first month.

The original Blue Collar Records version featured the band's original logo, a wordmark inside a roundel, situated to the top right just over Justin Brown, with the album title at the bottom. The Wind-up version featured an updated band wordmark logo in a Mason Serif Regular font, now situated on the top left, with the album title just below that, to the right. The band's updated logo would go on to become their permanent logo, although the font would eventually become slightly more extended on future releases.

Promotion, release, and commercial performance

Creed released four singles from My Own Prison: the title track in 1997, "Torn" in the spring of 1998, "What's This Life For" later that year, and "One" in early 1999. All four singles had success on the Mainstream Rock Tracks and Modern Rock Tracks charts. Because they were not initially sold in the United States, the singles were ineligible for the US Billboard Hot 100. However, by the time "One" was released, that restriction was lifted, and the song became Creed's first to chart, reaching number seventy. "My Own Prison" and "One" also managed to peak at numbers 54 and 49 on the US Billboard Hot 100 Airplay, respectively. The videos for the singles also received airplay on MTV. The Blue Collar release of My Own Prison was on June 24, 1997, and the Wind-up version came out on August 26, 1997.

My Own Prison peaked at number 22 on the Billboard 200 on May 2, 1998, staying on the chart for 112 weeks. The album also peaked at number one on the Heatseekers Albums chart on November 8, 1997. On January 22, 2000, the album reached number one on the Catalog Albums chart, remaining there for 157 weeks. My Own Prison was certified double platinum by the Recording Industry Association of America on August 25, 1998. On January 2, 1998, MTV reported that the album had sold 175,000 copies in the United States. On September 18, 1998, The New York Times stated that My Own Prison had sold 2,200,000 copies nationally. Time reported on October 18, 1999, that the record had sold nearly 4,000,000 copies. On January 3, 2002, Rolling Stone wrote that, according to Nielsen SoundScan, My Own Prison sold 5,700,000 copies in the US. As of 2009, the album had sold more than 6,000,000 copies in the US, according to Nielsen SoundScan. My Own Prison sold 15,000,000 copies worldwide, making it one of the most successful debut albums of all time.

Critical reception

My Own Prison received mixed reviews from critics. AllMusic wrote: "Creed don't have an original or distinctive sound—they basically fall into the category of post-Seattle bands who temper their grunge with a dose of Live earnestness—but they work well within their boundaries. At their best, they are a solid post-grunge band, grinding their riffs out with muscle; at their worst, they are simply faceless. The best moments of My Own Prison suggest they'll be able to leave post-grunge anonymity behind and develop their own signature sound." Trevor Miller of Music Critic described the album as "overall, an excellent first album".

Jon Pareles of The New York Times, with an article entitled "Grunge Gets Religion, and It's Not Pretty", criticized My Own Prison and wrote: "Convictions aside, Creed's weakness is its music. The band's imitation of Soundgarden circa 1991 is a clumsy one." The Spokesman-Review wrote: "I like the CD. I like the band, but there is room for improvement." Justin Seremet of the Hartford Courant panned My Own Prison, stating: "Just as the Warrants and Slaughters of the world hung around long after their brand of music had gone to the grave, so will Creed. Let's move on, folks."

Track listing

Blue Collar Records version
All tracks are written by Scott Stapp and Mark Tremonti.

Wind-up Records version

Personnel
Credits adapted from album liner notes.

Creed
 Scott Stapp – lead vocals
 Mark Tremonti – guitar, backing vocals, co-lead vocals on "My Own Prison"
 Brian Marshall – bass
 Scott Phillips – drums

Additional musician
 John Kurzweg – keyboards

Artwork
 Mark Droescher – art direction, art design, cover
 Creed – art direction
 Daniel Tremonti – cover, cover photography
 Justin Brown – cover photography
 Cece Wren, Judd Allison – additional photography

Production
 Jeff Hanson – executive producer
 John Kurzweg – producer, engineer
 Chris Carrol – assistant
 Andrew Roshberg – digital engineering
 Ron Saint-Germain – mixer
 Fran Flannery – assistant mix engineer
 Jessie Henderson – assistant mix engineer
 Howie Weinberg – mastering

Charts

Weekly charts

Year-end charts

Decade-end charts

Certifications

References

Creed (band) albums
1997 debut albums
Wind-up Records albums
Grunge albums